Ashmansworthy is a village in Devon, England. Recorded in the Domesday Book, it was in the hundred of Hartland.

References

External links
 

Villages in Devon